Grantley Sobers (born 16 May 1937) is a Barbadian weightlifter. Sobers represented the British West Indies at the 1959 Pan American Games, where he won the bronze medal in the Bantamweight competition. He competed in the men's bantamweight event at the 1960 Summer Olympics, finishing in 10th position with a lift of 307.5 kg.

References

External links
 

1937 births
Living people
Barbadian male weightlifters
Olympic weightlifters of the British West Indies
Weightlifters at the 1960 Summer Olympics
Place of birth missing (living people)
Pan American Games medalists in weightlifting
Pan American Games bronze medalists for the British West Indies
Weightlifters at the 1959 Pan American Games
Medalists at the 1959 Pan American Games